1891 in sports describes the year's events in world sport.

Athletics
USA Outdoor Track and Field Championships

American football
College championship
 College football national championship – Yale Bulldogs

Events
 Kansas defeats Missouri in the first Border War game 22-10 beginning one of the oldest and most fierce college football rivalries.

Association footballArgentina 
 Argentine Primera Division foundedBelgium Club Brugge KV foundedEngland The Football League – Everton 29 points, Preston North End 27, Notts County 26, Wolves 26, Bolton Wanderers 25, Blackburn Rovers 24
 FA Cup final – Blackburn Rovers 3–1 Notts County at The Oval
 The Football League expands from twelve to fourteen teams for the 1891–92 season: Stoke FC, having been expelled in 1890, is restored; Darwen is elected.Scotland The Scottish Football League's inaugural season is completed with a shared title
 Scottish Football League – Dumbarton and Rangers: title shared
 Scottish Cup final – Heart of Midlothian 1–0 Dumbarton at Hampden ParkUruguay 28 September — foundation of the Central Uruguay Railway Cricket Club (CURCC) by British railway workers in Montevideo; it later becomes C.A. Peñarol

BaseballNational championship National League v. American Association – series not held
 The National League winners are the Boston Beaneaters who decline to play against the American Association winners, the Boston RedsEvents The American Association folds after the season ends

BasketballEvents James Naismith of Springfield, Massachusetts invents basketball

BoxingEvents 14 January — Bob Fitzsimmons knocks out Jack Nonpareil Dempsey in the 13th round at New Orleans to win the Middleweight Championship of the World.  It is the first of three world titles that Fitzsimmons will hold during his career.Lineal world champions World Heavyweight Championship – John L. Sullivan
 World Middleweight Championship – Jack Nonpareil Dempsey → Bob Fitzsimmons
 World Welterweight Championship – title vacant
 World Lightweight Championship – Jack McAuliffe
 World Featherweight Championship – Young Griffo

CricketEvents Inaugural Inter-Colonial Tournament takes place in the West Indies involving Barbados, British Guiana and Trinidad & Tobago.England County Championship – Surrey
 Most runs – William Gunn 1336 @ 41.75 (HS 169)
 Most wickets – George Lohmann 177 @ 11.66 (BB 7–20)
 Wisden Five Great Bowlers – William Attewell, J T Hearne, Frederick Martin, Arthur Mold, John SharpeAustralia Most runs – George Giffen 275 runs @ 91.66 (HS 237)
 Most wickets – Jim Phillips 25 wickets @ 10.00 (BB 7–20)South Africa Currie Cup – KimberleyWest Indies Inter-Colonial Tournament – Barbados

GolfMajor tournaments British Open – Hugh KirkaldyOther tournaments British Amateur – Johnny Laidlay

Horse racingEngland Grand National – Come Away
 1,000 Guineas Stakes – Mimi
 2,000 Guineas Stakes – Common
 The Derby – Common
 The Oaks – Mimi
 St. Leger Stakes – CommonAustralia Melbourne Cup – MalvolioCanada Queen's Plate – VictoriousIreland Irish Grand National – Old Tom
 Irish Derby Stakes – NarraghmoreUSA Kentucky Derby – Kingman
 Preakness Stakes – not run
 Belmont Stakes – Foxford

Ice hockeyEvents 5 March — the Montreal Hockey Club defeats the Montreal Crescents 8–2 in a challenge to retain the 1891 AHAC season title.
 7 March — the Ottawa Hockey Club defeats the Toronto St. George's 5–0 to win the inaugural Ontario Hockey Association championship.Sweden Djurgårdens IF Hockey was founded in Stockholm

RowingThe Boat Race 21 March — Oxford wins the 48th Oxford and Cambridge Boat Race

Rugby footballHome Nations Championship The 9th series is won by Scotland with a 100% record against England, Ireland and Wales.Other events The 1891 British Lions tour to South Africa is the first British Isles tour of South Africa and only the second overseas tour conducted by a joint British team. Between 9 July and 7 September, the team plays 20 games, including three Tests against the South Africa national rugby union team. The British Isles wins all 20 matches including the three Tests. Although not named as such at the time, the tour is retrospectively recognised as a British Lions tour.

TennisEvents Inaugural French championship is held as the Championat de France International de Tennis.  Initially, only the men's singles is contested; the women's singles will begin in 1897.  Until 1924, the tournament is open only to tennis players who are licensed in France but, ironically, the inaugural tournament is won by an Englishman, H Briggs, who defeats French player P Baigneres in the final.  Briggs is a British resident living in Paris.England Wimbledon Men's Singles Championship – Wilfred Baddeley (GB) defeats Joshua Pim (Ireland) 6–4 1–6 7–5 6–0
 Wimbledon Women's Singles Championship – Lottie Dod (GB) defeats Blanche Bingley Hillyard (GB) 6–2 6–1France French Men's Singles Championship – H. Briggs (GB) defeats P. Baigneres (France) 6–3 6–2USA'''
 American Men's Singles Championship – Oliver Campbell (USA) defeats Clarence Hobart (USA) 2–6 7–5 7–9 6–1 6–2
 American Women's Singles Championship – Mabel Cahill (GB) defeats Ellen Roosevelt (USA) 6–4 6–1 4–6 6–3

References

 
Sports by year